The black-faced grosbeak (Caryothraustes poliogaster) is a large seed-eating bird in the cardinal family (Cardinalidae), which is a resident breeding species from south-eastern Mexico to eastern Panama.

Description
The adult black-faced grosbeak is 16.5 cm long, weighs 36 g, and has a heavy, mainly black, bill. It has a black face, yellow head, neck and breast, and olive back, wings and tail. The rump and belly are grey. Immatures are duller and have duskier face markings. The vocalisations include sharp chip or tweet calls, buzzes and whistles, and the song is a musical whistled cher chi weet, cher chir weet, cher chi chuweet.

Diet and behavior
The black-faced grosbeak forages in shrubs or trees for beetles, caterpillars and other insects, and also eats fruit such as those of gumbo-limbo (Bursera simaruba), seeds, and nectar taken from flowers or epiphyte bracts. It forms noisy flocks of up to 20 birds, and is often in mixed-species feeding flocks with honeycreepers and other tanagers as well as New World warblers. It generally tries to avoid human-altered habitat though it can be sometimes found in heavily degraded former subtropical or tropical forests.

Habitat and breeding
The species breeds in the Central American lowlands and foothills from sea level to about 1000 m altitude, and is found in the canopy and middle levels of dense wet forests, tall second growth, and semi-open habitats such as woodland edge and clearings. The nest is a bowl constructed from bromeliad leaves and other epiphytes 3–6 m high in a small tree or palm. The female lays three brown-spotted grey-white eggs between April and June.

Footnotes

References
 Foster, Mercedes S. (2007): The potential of fruiting trees to enhance converted habitats for migrating birds in southern Mexico. Bird Conservation International 17(1): 45–61.  PDF fulltext
 Stiles, F. Gary & Skutch, Alexander Frank (1989): A guide to the birds of Costa Rica. Comistock, Ithaca. 

black-faced grosbeak
Birds of Central America
Birds of Belize
black-faced grosbeak
black-faced grosbeak